C12-C14 alcohol glycidyl ether (AGE) is an organic chemical in the glycidyl ether family. It is a mixture of mainly 12 and 14 carbon chain alcohols, also called fatty alcohols that have been glycidated. It is an industrial chemical used as a surfactant but primarily for epoxy resin viscosity reduction. It has the CAS number 68609-97-2 but the IUPAC name is more complex as it is a mixture and is 2-(dodecoxymethyl)oxirane;2-(tetradecoxymethyl)oxirane;2-(tridecoxymethyl)oxirane. Other names include dodecyl and tetradecyl glycidyl ethers and alkyl (C12-C14) glycidyl ether.

Manufacture
A fatty alcohol mixture rich in C12-C14 alcohols is placed in a reactor with a Lewis acid catalyst. Then epichlorohydrin is added slowly to control exotherm which results in the formation of the halohydrins. This is followed by a caustic dehydrochlorination, to form C12-C14 alcohol glycidyl ether.
The waste products are water and sodium chloride and excess caustic soda. One of the quality control tests would involve measuring the Epoxy value by determination of the epoxy equivalent weight.

Uses
As an epoxy modifier it is classed as an epoxy reactive diluent. It is one of a family of glycidyl ethers available used for viscosity reduction of epoxy resins. These are then further formulated into coatings, sealants, adhesives, and elastomers. Resins with this diluent tend to show improved workability. It is also used to synthesize other molecules. The use of the diluent does effect mechanical properties and microstructure of epoxy resins.

Toxicology
The toxicology is well known, and it is classed as a skin irritant.

See also
 Epoxide
 Glycidol

References

Further reading

External websites
 Denacol epoxy diluent range
    Reactive Diluents – Olin Epoxy
  Hexion Epoxy Functional Modifiers
 Cargill Reactive diluents

Glycidyl ethers
Reactive diluents